Gary Lennon is an American playwright, television writer and executive producer. He is currently a showrunner on Power and Hightown, both for the Starz network, where he has an overall development deal. He is also an executive producer on Euphoria for HBO. In 2013, Lennon won a Peabody Award for the first season of Orange is the New Black along with his fellow writers and producers.

Early life 
Lennon grew up in Hell's Kitchen. He was orphaned by age 11, he dropped out of high school, and he did not attend college.

Career 
Lennon began his career as an aspiring actor. He studied under Geraldine Page, who encouraged him to write about his own life.  Lennon compiled his monologues to create his first play, Blackout. After being rejected by the Circle Repertory Company as a young playwright, Lennon left one of his plays backstage at a theater attended by Marshall W. Mason, the founder of the company. Mason read the play that Lennon had addressed to him, and set him up on his first meetings.

Awards and nominations

References

External links 

American writers
American film producers
Showrunners
Living people
Year of birth missing (living people)